Rinyaújlak is a village in Somogy county, Hungary. Originally inhabited by people of the district of the Queen of Segesd, in 1401 the village was named Laak, being known later in the 15th century as Wylaak.

History
According to László Szita the settlement was completely Hungarian in the 18th century.

External links 
 Street map (Hungarian)

References 

Populated places in Somogy County